Botsford Lake is a lake in the Hudson Bay drainage basin in Kenora District in northwestern Ontario, Canada. The CN transcontinental rail line travels the along the entire south shore.

The primary inflow and outflow is the Marchington River, coming in at the northeast end of the lake just downstream of McDougall Falls, and exiting at the southwest end a few kilometres upstream of the river's mouth at Abram Lake on the English River. A secondary inflow, at the south, is an unnamed creek coming from Black Lake.

See also
List of lakes in Ontario

References

Other map sources:

Lakes of Kenora District